Persian Gulf is a mediterranean sea in Western Asia.

Persian Gulf may also refer to:
, a warship
Persian Gulf University, Bushehr Province, Iran
Persian Gulf (missile), an Iranian anti-ship munition
Persian Gulf forever, song by Ebi
Persian Gulf (horse) (1940–1964), a British thoroughbred racehorse

See also

Persian Gulf War (disambiguation)
Persian Gulf naming dispute